Giza Governorate is one of the governorates of Egypt. It is in the center of the country, situated on the west bank of the Nile River opposite Cairo.  Its capital is the city of Giza.  It includes a stretch of the left bank of the Nile Valley around Giza, and acquired a large stretch of Egypt's Western Desert, including Bahariya Oasis when the 6th of October Governorate was merged into it on 14 April 2011.  The Giza Governorate is also home to the Great Sphinx and the Pyramids of Giza.

Overview
The rate of poverty is more than 60% in this governorate but recently some social safety networks have been provided in the form of financial assistance and job opportunities. The funding has been coordinated by the country's Ministry of Finance and with assistance from international organizations.

Municipal divisions
The governorate is divided into municipal divisions, with a total estimated population as of July 2017 of 8,666,090. In the case of Giza governorate, there are a number of aqsam and marakiz, with fully urban and rural parts. Sometimes a markaz and a kism share a name.

Population

According to population estimates from 2015 the majority of residents in the governorate lived in urban areas, with an urbanization rate of 58.6%. Out of an estimated 7,585,115 people residing in the governorate, 4,446,805 people lived in urban areas as opposed to only 3,138,310 in rural areas.

According to population estimates from 2018 the majority of residents in the governorate live in urban areas, with an urbanization rate of 60.9%. Out of an estimated 8,759,000 people residing in the governorate, 5,332,000 people live in urban areas as opposed to only 3,428,000 in rural areas.

Industrial zones
According to the Egyptian Governing Authority for Investment and Free Zones (GAFI), and the Ministry of Investment, the following industrial zones are located in this governorate:
 Abo Rwash Industrial Zone
 6 October Industrial Zone
 Al Wahat (Heavy) Industrial zone

Important sites
The Great Pyramid of Giza is one of the Seven Wonders of the Ancient World and people come from all over the world each year to see it. It is located in the Giza pyramid complex. 

 Abusir
 Bahariya Oasis
 Giza Necropolis - Giza pyramid complex

Projects
In 1981, the Basic Village Service Program (BVS), under the auspices of USAID, had several water, and road projects, going on in several markazes in the Giza Governorate.

In a program that began on August 28, 2012 (through 2018), the European Union invested 40 million Euros on upgrading the infrastructure of informal areas in Giza Governorate.

References

 
Governorates of Egypt